Kostas Karras (21 June 1936 – 6 May 2012) was a Greek actor and politician.

Biography

Karras was born in Athens and trained as an actor at the Royal Academy of Dramatic Art in London and the drama school of the National Theatre of Greece. After making his screen debut in 1961, he was a regular feature in Greek cinema throughout the 1960s and 1970s.

Karras was a member of the Hellenic Parliament from 2000 to 2007, representing the New Democracy party. He was a member of the Steering Committee of the Bilderberg Group.

Filmography
Imperiale (1968)
Ipolochagos Natassa (1970)
Iphigenia (1977)

References

External links
 

1936 births
2012 deaths
Alumni of RADA
Greek male film actors
Greek male television actors
Greek MPs 2000–2004
Greek MPs 2004–2007
Members of the Steering Committee of the Bilderberg Group
New Democracy (Greece) politicians
Politicians from Athens
Greek actor-politicians
Male actors from Athens